Marko may refer to:

 Béla Markó (born 1951), Romanian politician and writer of Hungarian ethnicity
 Helmut Marko (born 1943), Austrian racecar driver
 Ida Marko-Varga (born 1985), Swedish swimmer
 Karol Marko (born 1966), Slovak football manager

See also
 Marko (given name)

Surnames from given names